Raymond Phillip De Gruchy (born 18 May 1932) is a former professional footballer from Guernsey who played as a full-back.

References

1983 births
Living people
Guernsey footballers
Association football fullbacks
Burton Albion F.C. players
Chesterfield F.C. players
English Football League players
Grimsby Town F.C. players
Nottingham Forest F.C. players